Wortman is an occupational surname of British origin, meaning a grower or seller of vegetables or herbs, from the Middle English wurt or wort meaning "plant". A similar name of German origin is Wortmann. The surname Wortman may refer to:

Bob Wortman (1927–2015), American sports referee
Chuck Wortman (1892–1977), American baseball player
Denys Wortman (1887–1958), American artist
Don I. Wortman (born 1927), American federal government executive
Frank Wortman (1904–1968), American gangster
Gabriel Wortman (1968–2020), Canadian mass shooter
Gabrielle Wortman (born 1989), American musician
George G. Wortman (1841–1913), American soldier
Keith Wortman (born 1950), American football player
Kevin Wortman (born 1969), American hockey player

Other uses
Olds, Wortman & King, department store in Oregon

See also
Wortmann

References

Surnames of British Isles origin